For Thai television soap operas, Thara Himalaya is a 2010 Thai lakorn 1 in a 4 drama series. It is called 4 Huajai Haeng Koon Kao or 4 Hearts of the Mountains which aired on Channel 3. It starred Atichart Chumnanon and Kimberly Ann Voltemas. 4 Huajai Haeng Koon Kao was a special lakorn as it celebrated Channel 3's 40th Anniversary.

Synopsis

The story started when Thiptara or Nam (Kimberly Ann Voltemas) the youngest of the 4 quadruplets of the Adisuan family, met and fell in love with Puwanes (Atichart Chumnanon) the crown prince of the country called Parawat, who Nam believes is a simple worker on his brother Fai's (Nadech Kugimiya) farm.

When Prince Puwanes visits Thailand, he is victim to an assassination attempt organised by the Prime Minister Shadul (Noppon Gomarachun). He is badly injured and gets sent to the hospital where Nam is his attending doctor. During his recovery, Puwanes has to pretend that he lost his memory in order to protect his identity and safety. Nam nicknames him 'Pupen' meaning crab, since he apparently cannot remember his real identity.

Cast

Main cast
 Atichart Chumnanon (Aum) as Prince Puwanes Vasuthep Srivasatava Rajaput/Pupen
 Kimberly Ann Voltemas (Kim) as Thiptara "Nam" Adisuan
 Nadech Kugimiya (Barry) as Akkanee "Fai" Adisuan
 Prin Suparat (Mark) as Pathapee "Din" Adisuan
 Pakorn Chatborirak (Boy) as Wayupak "Lom" Adisuan

Supporting Cast 
 Soravit Suboon (Kong) as Dr. Nat
 Maneerat Kumoun (Ae) as Preeyanuch "Pam"
 Mavin Taveepol as Rajeev
 Adisorn Athakrit (Tao) as Varun 
 Noppon Gomarachun (Too) as Prime Minister Shadul
 Kriengkrai Oonhanun as King Vasuthep
 Thitima Sanghapitak (Mam) as Queen
 Thongkao Pattarachokchai
 Santisuk Promsiri as Montree Adisuan
 Jintara Sukapat as Supansa Adisuan

Special appearances
Urassaya Sperbund as Jeed

Awards

External links 
 

Thai television soap operas
2010s Thai television series
2010 Thai television series debuts
2010 Thai television series endings
Channel 3 (Thailand) original programming